Slim was a rock band lasting from the late 1990s to 2003 from Christchurch, New Zealand who are best known for their singles 'Rise Up' and 'Bullet in My Hand'.

The members of the band were:
 Aaron Hogg (vocals, guitar)
 Donald McClure (vocals, bass)
 Scott Mason (drums)
 Simon Meehan (guitar)

References

New Zealand rock music groups
Organisations based in Christchurch
Culture in Christchurch